The 2001 Three Days of De Panne was the 25th edition of the Three Days of De Panne cycle race and was held on 3 April to 5 April 2001. The race started in Mouscron and finished in De Panne. The race was won by Nico Mattan.

General classification

References

Three Days of Bruges–De Panne
2001 in Belgian sport